Mike Houlihan (born February 1969 in Kilmallock, County Limerick) is a retired Irish sportsperson.  He played hurling with his local club Kilmallock and was a member of the Limerick senior inter-county team between 1987 and 1999. During the course of a decorated career with club and county, Houlihan won two Munster titles, two national Hurling Leagues, two county titles and two Munster club championships. He represented Limerick in the 1994 and 1996 All-Ireland senior hurling deciders at Croke Park.

References

Teams

1970 births
Living people
Kilmallock hurlers
Limerick inter-county hurlers
Munster inter-provincial hurlers